The coat of arms of Schleswig or Southern Jutland depicts two blue lions in a golden shield. It is the heraldic symbol of the former Duchy of Schleswig, originally a Danish province but later disputed between Danes and Germans. The region has been divided between Germany and Denmark since 1920 and the symbol consequently appears in official heraldry in both countries. It is derived from the national coat of arms of Denmark and has been dated to the middle of the 13th century, first known from the arms of Erik Abelsøn, Duke of Schleswig. Throughout the ages, the design has featured both crowned and uncrowned lions, the lions have occasionally been accompanied by heraldic hearts, and usage between heraldic lions and leopards has shifted. The far most common version was to omit both crowns and hearts and this version has been used exclusively for several centuries.

The blazon in heraldic terms is: Or, two lions passant in pale Azure armed Or langued Gules.

Current use

Denmark
The unmodified arms of Schleswig is represented in the coat of arms of Denmark's royal family. The symbol has been located in the top-right corner since 1819 as specified by royal decree. The current version was specified by royal decree on 5 July 1972.

A modified form of the symbol was used by the South Jutland County from 1980 until the county was dissolved effective January 1, 2007. The county originally wished to use the historic arms, but official authorisation was withheld to avoid confusion with both the royal coat of arms and the arms of the German Bundesland Schleswig-Holstein. This modified version showed the two lions jointly holding a Danish pennant. This was inspired by the medieval seal of Eric of Pomerania in which the three lions jointly hold the Danish flag.

Germany
The coat of arms of Schleswig-Holstein is a combination of the historic insignia of Holstein and a slightly modified version of the Schleswig arms. This symbol was used by the secessionist German administration of the two duchies during the First War of Schleswig (1848–51) and depicted on the currency issued by this administration. At this time, the lions faced left. The area became a Prussian province following the Second War of Schleswig (1864) and the symbol was restored. The lions have faced right since the 1880s. According to legend, this change was ordered by Otto von Bismarck who noted that it was "impolite" of the Schleswig lions to turn their backs on Holstein. The official insignia is reserved for the government of Schleswig-Holstein, but a slightly modified version is allowed for use by the general public. The lions also appear in the coats of arms of the city of Flensburg, and the Kreise Schleswig-Flensburg and Rendsburg-Eckernförde. Many municipal arms in the German part of Schleswig also use insignia featuring either the two lions or the Schleswig colours, blue and yellow.

Gallery

References

See also
 Coat of arms of Denmark

Danish coats of arms
German coats of arms
Schleswig
Coat of arms